976 is the international dialing country code for Mongolia.

Numbering Convention
National Significant Numbers (NSN) are eight digits in length.
There are two different Domestic long distance access codes in Mongolia: 01 (Mongolia Telecom network) and 02 (Mongolian Railway network).

Area codes
The following is a list of area codes for the different provinces of Mongolia. 
Capital region
Ulaanbaatar: 1
Suburban: 2X or 2XX or 2XXX
Central and Northern region: 3X or 3XX or 3XXX
Western region: 4X or 4XX or 4XXX
Eastern region: 5X or 5XX or 5XXX
Area code of Aimag: XX (3X, 4X, 5X)
Aimag center: XX2 (3X2, 4X2, 5X2)
Sum center: XXXX (3XXX, 4XXX, 5XXX)

Dialing codes 
The following is a list of dialing codes for the different provinces of Mongolia.

References

Mongolia
Telephone numbers